Abdel Nabil Yarou (born 16 June 1993) is a Beninese international footballer who plays for Enyimba FC, as a defender.

Club career
Yarou began his career off with ASPAC, before signing for Buffles de Borgou in June 2017.

International career
On 4 May 2017, Yarou made his debut for Benin in a 1–1 draw against Burkina Faso. On 31 May 2017, Yarou scored his first goal for Benin in a 1–1 draw against Ivory Coast.

International goals
Scores and results list Benin's goal tally first.

References

1993 births
Living people
People from Parakou
Beninese footballers
Benin international footballers
ASPAC FC players
Buffles du Borgou FC players
Association football defenders